The crested becard (Pachyramphus validus), also known as the plain becard, is a species of bird in the family Tityridae. It has traditionally been placed in Cotingidae or Tyrannidae, but evidence strongly suggest it is better placed in Tityridae, where it is now placed by the South American Classification Committee.

Distribution and habitat
It is found in Argentina, Bolivia, Brazil, Ecuador, Paraguay, and Peru. Its natural habitats are subtropical or tropical moist lowland forests, subtropical or tropical moist montane forests, and heavily degraded former forest.

References

crested becard
Birds of Brazil
Birds of Bolivia
Birds of Paraguay
Birds of the Yungas
crested becard
Taxonomy articles created by Polbot